The Agreement on Sub-Regional Arms Control is an arms limitation agreement signed on June 14, 1996, in Florence, Italy. In accordance with article IV, Annex 1-B to the Dayton Accord, the agreement draws from the provisions of the Treaty on Conventional Armed Forces in Europe and limits the number of tanks, armored combat vehicles, artillery, combat aircraft and attack helicopters that the parties to the agreement can possess. As part of the agreement, the parties of FR Yugoslavia (now succeeded by Serbia and Montenegro), the two entities of Bosnia and Herzegovina (the Federation of Bosnia and Herzegovina and the Republica Srpska) and Croatia annually exchange information on and allow inspections of their military holdings. It was signed under the supervision of the OSCE.

An amendment to the Agreement, in effect since 1 January 2015, ends the involvement of OSCE, leaving the enforcement to the signatory countries.


See also
Treaty on Conventional Armed Forces in Europe
Dayton Accord

References

Further reading

External links
Agreement on Sub-Regional Arms Control (PDF)

 
Arms control treaties
Treaties of Bosnia and Herzegovina
Treaties concluded in 1996
Treaties of Serbia and Montenegro
Treaties of Croatia